Zhao Xuri (born 3 December 1985) is a Chinese footballer who currently plays for Sichuan Jiuniu in the China League One division.

Club career
While Zhao Xuri started his football career with second tier side Dalian Sidelong, he did not make an impact in the squad; however, top tier side Sichuan First City took an interest within the youngster. During the 2003 league season, he quickly rose to prominence and immediately established himself as an integral member within the team by playing in 27 league games and scoring two goals in his debut season. The following season was to prove significantly more difficult as Zhao was injured through most of the season only making nine appearances. He was still highly regarded enough to be transferred to Dalian Shide at the start of the 2005 season where, due to his versatility, he would continue to establish himself as a regular and go on win the top tier title in 2005. He then transferred to Shaanxi Renhe at the start of the 2010 season.

Zhao transferred to Guangzhou Evergrande on 26 December 2011 along with Rong Hao, Li Jianbin and Peng Xinli. He made his debut for the club on 25 February 2012 in a 2-1 win against Tianjin Teda in the 2012 Chinese FA Super Cup. He scored first goal for the club on 21 July 2012 in a 2-1 win against Henan Jianye.

On 21 January 2016, Zhao transferred to China League One side Tianjin Quanjian. He made his debut for the club on 13 March 2016 in a 3-0 win against Qingdao Huanghai. He scored his first goal for the club on 19 March 2016 in a 5-2 win against Zhejiang Yiteng.

On 13 February 2019, Zhao transferred to fellow Chinese Super League side Dalian Professional. After three seasons with the club he would leave on a free transfer to join Sichuan Jiuniu on 1 May 2022.

International career
Zhao's performances for Sichuan First City in the 2003 season were enough for an immediate call-up to the Chinese national team to play in the 2003 East Asian Football Championship. He made his debut during the tournament on 7 December 2003 in a 1-0 loss against South Korea. During the tournament, he would also go on to score his first goal on 10 December 2003 in a 3-1 win against Hong Kong. His versatility saw him gain significant playing time and go on to be selected in the squad to participate in the 2007 AFC Asian Cup where he played in two group games in an unsuccessful competition that saw China knocked out in the group stage.

In 2008, Zhao was eligible to play in the 2008 Summer Olympics where he played two of the three group games in the tournament. Once the tournament ended, he found himself completely dropped from the national team until then manager Gao Hongbo named him in his first game on 29 May 2009 in a 1-1 draw against Germany.

Career statistics

Club statistics
.

International statistics

International goals
 
Scores and results list China's goal tally first.

Honours

Club
Dalian Shide
Chinese Super League: 2005
Chinese FA Cup: 2005

Guangzhou Evergrande
Chinese Super League: 2012, 2013, 2014, 2015
Chinese FA Cup: 2012
Chinese FA Super Cup: 2012
AFC Champions League: 2013, 2015

Tianjin Quanjian
China League One: 2016

International
China PR national football team
East Asian Football Championship: 2005, 2010

References

External links

football-lineups.com Player stats at football-lineups website

csldata.sports.sohu.com Player stats at sohu.com

1985 births
Living people
Chinese footballers
Footballers from Dalian
China international footballers
Olympic footballers of China
Footballers at the 2006 Asian Games
2007 AFC Asian Cup players
Footballers at the 2008 Summer Olympics
2011 AFC Asian Cup players
2019 AFC Asian Cup players
Sichuan Guancheng players
Dalian Shide F.C. players
Beijing Renhe F.C. players
Guangzhou F.C. players
Tianjin Tianhai F.C. players
Dalian Professional F.C. players
Chinese Super League players
China League One players
Association football midfielders
Asian Games competitors for China